Ernst Hilger a curator as well as the owner and founder of Hilger modern/contemporary and Hilger BrotKunsthalle.
 
A gallery owner and a philanthropist mediator, Hilger travels the world in search of new art while also providing a platform for established artists. He has championed the less well-known contemporary art of countries like Iran and continents such as Latin America and Africa.  Hilger makes decisions on exhibiting based on his extensive knowledge of the international art market and also his on site researches in the art hotspots in the cities he visits.

Biography 

Ernst Hilger was born on 28 February 1950 in Vienna.
Elementary school, secondary school (at Theresianum, Rainergasse, Vienna)
Graduated high-school in 1968
Studied business administration (Vienna University of Economics and Business)
Began working as official for cultural and other events
Founded and managed Atlantis Folklokal, parallel to his university studies
Drew up program for the Zentralsparkasse's Youth Club
Founded the students' edition "édition étudiante"
1971: Founding shareholder of Galerie Academia/Salzburg
1972: Founding shareholder of Galerie Spectrum
1974: Co-publisher of GALERIENSPIEGEL, the first Austrian art magazine, together with Paul Kruntorad; important art critics, such as Liesbeth Wächter-Böhm, for example, had their first opportunity here to publish their comprehensive art reviews;
1976: Started his own art gallery at Dorotheergasse
1977: Began to publish
Since 1996 increased promotional activities for young artists
together with Siemens Austria Founded artLab
1997: Expanded the program to Central Europe, with artists such as Mihael Milunovic, Maja Vukoje, Renata Poljak, etc.
1997: founding the internet-magazine for art www.artmagazine.cc
2003: opening des hilger contemporary, platform for international contemporary art
Kuratorische Leitung des Projekts Austrian Art Lounge der Austrian Airlines
Präsident der FEAGA (Europ. Galerieverband) bis 1997
2009 opening of HilgerBROTKunsthalle

Publications of Verlag Galerie Ernst Hilger about and together with 

In 1976, first publication together with Manfred Chobot, and with illustrations by Alfred Hrdlicka.
Next, H. C. Artmann and Uwe Bremer: "die Heimholung des Hammers" (Bringing the hammer back home)
Alfred Hrdlicka – Register of art works from prints and graphics to sculpture and writings, more exhibition catalogues and catalogues on various topics:
Museum Moderner Kunst Passau, Frankfurter Kunstverein, Vienna Künstlerhaus.
Karl Korab – Register of graphic works, together with Dr. Walter Koschatzky (1982) and monography with Dr. Assmann and Prof. Dr. Ronte (1999).
Gunter Damisch (Museum catalogue for the Museum Folkwang, Essen).
Franz Ringel, commissioned by the Museum of Art History/Palais Harrach; Hans Staudacher (for the Museum of Art History/Palais Harrach); Georg Eisler (3 catalogues and the big monography for Österreichische Galerie Oberes Belevedere, catalogue and book for Albertina and Museum of Art History/Palais Harrach); Karl Korab (for the Museum of Art History/Palais Harrach); Christian Attersee (for the Museum of Art History/Palais Harrach); Alfred Hrdlicka (for the Museum of Art History/Palais Harrach) 1998, 2002.
Amor Roma, commissioned by the Museum for Modern Art, together Lorand Hegyi as author.
Contemporary Art from Rome, Leo Zogmayer, Nikolaus Moser (exhibition catalogue for Folkwang Museum Essen)
Sebastian Weissenbacher, Hans Fronius, Adolf Frohner – among other things: Albertina catalogue.
Christian Ludwig Attersee, Oscar Bottolo (register of works)
The Art of Bronze Casting – The Zöttl Studio.
Etchings – The Kurt Zein Studio.
Central – New Art from Central Europe, (5)
Register of works by Mel Ramos.
 
Numerous publications for artLab – An initiative by Siemens Austria and Galerie Ernst Hilger.
 
Publications on contemporary artists (France and Italy): Sandro Chia, Bruno Ceccobelli, Tirelli, Pizzi Canella and artists of Figuration Narrative – Erró, Gérard Fromanger, Peter Klasen, Jacques Monory, Bernard Rancillac.

International Museums – Exhibitions and Exhibitions of Austrian Art with Publications 

Surface Radical – Young Artists from Austria at Grand Palais, Paris, with Lorand Hegyi as curator, 1990.
Master works of Albertina at Grand Palais – Special showing at SAGA Paris, 1989.
4x4 Generations of Austrian Art, Düsseldorf, 1990, together with Dr. Lorand Hegyi, Dr. Dieter Schrage, Prof. Peter Baum.
SERVUS – 5 Artists from Austria, at Mannheimer Kunstverein, 1997.
Infeld Collection 1 – 3; Portrait of a Collection, at Landesgalerie Eisenstadt.
Art and Virtual Reality – The Collection of Bank Austria, Palais Harrach, 1998; Poliakoff from the Würth Collection, Künstlerhaus, Vienna, 1998.
Moser, Wölzl, Zogmayer – Künstlerhaus, Vienna.
Leo Zogmayer at the Museum of Modern Art/Liechtenstein, curator Lorand Hegyi, 1990.
7 exhibitions in the course of the Bank Austria/trend-profil series of exhibitions at the Museum of Art History/Palais Harrach, Österreichische Galerie Oberes Belvedere and Albertina at the Austrian National Library, 1997 to 2002 (Georg Eisler, Karl Korab, Franz Ringel, Christian Ludwig Attersee, Alfred Hrdlicka, Hans Staudacher).
"Wagnis Wagner" (Venturing Wagner), together with Alfred Hrdilicka, Meiningen 2002.
Central – New Art from Central Europe at Museumsquartier, curators Carl Aginer and Lorand Hegyi, 2001
Alfred Hrdilicak at the Museum of Art History/Palais Harrach, curator Peter Baum.
Central Europe revisited I+II at Castle Esterházy/ Eisenstadt 2006/2007
tbc…

Important Positions 
 Founding member of the Association of Austrian Galleries of Modern Art, together with Herbert Grass.
 1987–1993: Member of the Artistic Advisory Council of Art Basel for Austria
 1998/1999: Member of the Bank Austria Artistic Advisory Council
 Since 1996: Artistic Director and Curator of Siemens Austria Collection and Siemens Sponsoring Program for Young Art
 Since 1996: Member of the Artistic Advisory Council of Wiener Kunstmesse at the Museum for Applied Arts
 1986–1998: Chairman of the Association of Austrian Galleries of Modern Art
 1998: Curator of the Festival Exhibitions, Eisenstadt
 1999: Member of the Artistic Advisory Council of the SCA Art Jury
 2003: Chairman of the Association of European Galleries of Modern Art

Galleries 
 Since 1971 in Vienna
 1987–1993: outlet in Frankfurt
 Since 1998: outlet in Paris to promote Austrian modern and young art
 Since 1998: artLab – An initiative by Siemens Austria and Galerie Ernst Hilger
 Since 2009: BROTKunsthalle

Awards and honors
 1996 - Award by the City of Vienna
 2000 - Professor title in honor (by the cultural ministry of Austria)
 2002 - Officier of the Ordre des Arts et des Lettres
 2009 - Golden Grand-Award by the City of Vienna

References 

1950 births
Living people
20th-century Austrian people
Businesspeople from Vienna
Austrian art curators
Commandeurs of the Ordre des Arts et des Lettres